Chandan Sahani (born 29 January 1998) is an Indian cricketer. He made his List-A debut for Hyderabad in the 2021–22 Vijay Hazare Trophy on 8 December 2021. He made his first-class debut on 3 March 2022, for Hyderabad in the 2021–22 Ranji Trophy.

References

External links
 

1998 births
Living people
Indian cricketers
Hyderabad cricketers
Place of birth missing (living people)